The history of sexual slavery in the United States is the history of slavery for the purpose of sexual exploitation as it exists in the United States.

Enslaved African-Americans were systematically raped or forced to reproduce with other enslaved people.  Early American colonists were mostly men, and some resorted to rape to procure wives. Native American women were often kidnapped to be traded, sold, or taken as wives. Currently, under federal law, a prostitute is considered a victim of human trafficking if they are under 18 and/or are being controlled through force, fraud, or coercion. However, this is not fully implemented, and in many states, prostitutes who are considered victims under federal law are still arrested and prosecuted under state law.

Early Americas 

It is contended by some that as early as the 1490s Christopher Columbus had established trade in sex slaves on Hispaniola, which included sex slaves as young as nine years old.  Within 25 years of being colonized, the Native population of Hispaniola drastically declined, due to the effects of enslavement, massacre, and infectious disease.

However, others consider this contention to have arisen from a misreading of primary documents. Columbus does mention the selling of slaves, but as atrocities of a rebelling faction. He continues with this comment, "I declare solemnly that a great number of men have been to the Indies, who did not deserve baptism in the eyes of God or men, and who are now returning thither.”

Under chattel slavery 

From the beginning of African slavery in the North American colonies, slaves were often viewed as property, rather than people. Plaçage, a formalized system of concubinage among slave women or free people of color, developed in Louisiana and particularly New Orleans by the 18th century.

Slave breeding was the attempt by a slave-owner to increase the reproduction of his slaves for profit. It included forced sexual relations between male and female slaves, encouraging slave pregnancies, sexual relations between master and slave to produce slave children, and favoring female slaves who had many children. The historian E. Franklin Frazier, in his book The Negro Family, stated that "there were masters who, without any regard for the preferences of their slaves, mated their human chattel as they did their stock." Ex-slave Maggie Stenhouse remarked, "Durin' slavery there were stockmen. They was weighed and tested. A man would rent the stockman and put him in a room with some young women he wanted to raise children from."

Concubine slaves were the only female slaves who commanded a higher price than skilled male slaves.

In Louisiana 

The plaçage system developed from the predominance of white men among early colonial populations, who took women as consorts from Native Americans and enslaved Africans. In this period there was a shortage of European women, as the colonies were dominated in the early day by male explorers and colonists. Given the harsh conditions in Louisiana, persuading women to follow the men was not easy. France sent females convicted along with their debtor husbands, and in 1719, deported 209 women felons "who were of a character to be sent to the French settlement in Louisiana." France also relocated young women and girls known as King's Daughters to the colonies of Canada and Louisiana for marriage.

Through warfare and raids, Native American women were often captured to be traded, sold, or taken as wives. At first, the colony generally imported male Africans to use as slave labor because of the heavy work of clearing to develop plantations. Over time, it also imported African female slaves. Marriage between the races was forbidden according to the Code Noir of the eighteenth century, but interracial sex continued. The upper class European men during this period often did not marry until their late twenties or early thirties. Premarital sex with an intended white bride, especially if she was of high rank, was not permitted socially.

White male colonists, often the younger sons of noblemen, military men, and planters, who needed to accumulate some wealth before they could marry, took women of color as consorts before marriage. Merchants and administrators also followed this practice if they were wealthy enough.

Post-emancipation 
After the enslaved people were emancipated, many states passed anti-miscegenation laws, which prohibited interracial marriage between whites and non-whites. But this did not stop some white men from taking sexual advantage of black women by using their social positions under the Jim Crow system and white supremacy, or in other parts of the country by ordinary power and wealth dynamics.

The Chinese Tanka females were sold from Guangzhou to work as prostitutes for the overseas Chinese male community in the United States. During the California Gold Rush in the late 1840s, Chinese merchants transported thousands of young Chinese girls, including babies, from China to the United States and sold them into sexual slavery within the red light district of San Francisco. Girls could be bought for as cheap as $40 (about $1104 in 2013 dollars) in Guangzhou, and sold for $400 (about $11,040 in 2013 dollars) in the United States. Many of these girls were forced into opium addiction and lived their entire lives as prostitutes. Anglo-American doctors claimed that opium smoking led to increased involvement in prostitution by young white women and to genetic contamination via miscegenation by Chinese men. Anti-Chinese advocates believed America faced a dual dilemma: opium smoking was ruining moral standards and Chinese labor was lowering wages and taking jobs away from European-Americans.
Slummers often frequented the brothels and opium dens of Chinatown in the late 1880s and early 1890s. However, by the mid-1890s, slummers rarely participated in Chinese brothels or opium smoking, but instead were shown fake opium joints where Chinese actors and their white wives staged illicit scenes for the benefit of their audiences.

A few captives from Native American tribes who were used as slaves were not freed, when African-American slaves were emancipated. "Ute Woman," a Ute captured by the Arapaho and later sold to a Cheyenne, was one example. Used as a prostitute for sale to American soldiers at Cantonment in the Indian Territory, she lived in slavery until about 1880 when she died of a hemorrhage resulting from "excessive sexual intercourse".

White slavery 

By the 19th century, most of America's cities had a designated, legally protected area of prostitution. Increased urbanization and young women entering the workforce led to greater flexibility in courtship without supervision. It is in this changing social sphere that the panic over "white slavery" began. This term referred to women being coerced, lured, or kidnapped for the purposes of prostitution.

Numerous communities appointed vice commissions to investigate the extent of local prostitution, whether prostitutes participated in it willingly or were forced into it and the degree to which it was organized by any cartel-type organizations. The second significant action at the local levels was to close the brothels and the red light districts. From 1910 to 1913, city after city withdrew this tolerance and forced the closing of their brothels. Opposition to openly practiced prostitution had been growing steadily throughout the last decades of the 19th century. The federal government's response to the moral panic was the Mann Act. The purpose of the act was to make it a crime to coerce transportation of unwilling women. The statute made it a crime to "transport or cause to be transported, or aid to assist in obtaining transportation for" or to "persuade, induce, entice or coerce" a woman to travel.

According to historian Mark Thomas Connelly, "a group of books and pamphlets appeared announcing a startling claim: a pervasive and depraved conspiracy was at large in the land, brutally trapping and seducing American girls into lives of enforced prostitution, or 'white slavery.' These white slave narratives, or white-slave tracts, began to circulate around 1909."  Such narratives often portrayed innocent girls "victimized by a huge, secret and powerful conspiracy controlled by foreigners", as they were drugged or imprisoned and forced into prostitution.

This excerpt from The War on the White Slave Trade was written by the United States District Attorney in Chicago:

Suffrage activists, especially Harriet Burton Laidlaw and Rose Livingston, worked in New York City's Chinatown and in other cities to rescue young white and Chinese girls from forced prostitution, and helped pass the Mann Act to make interstate sex trafficking a federal crime. Livingston publicly discussed her past as a prostitute and claimed to have been abducted and developed a drug problem as a sex slave in a Chinese man's home, narrowly escaped and experienced a Christian conversion narrative. Other groups like the Woman's Christian Temperance Union and Hull House focused on children of prostitutes and poverty in community life while trying to pass protective legislation. The American Purity Alliance also supported the Mann Act. In New York City, the Travelers Aid Society of New York provided social services to women at train stations and piers in order to prevent trafficking.

In 1910, the US Congress passed the White Slave Traffic Act of 1910 (better known as the Mann Act), which made it a felony to transport women across state borders for the purpose of "prostitution or debauchery, or for any other immoral purpose". Its primary stated intent was to address prostitution, immorality, and human trafficking particularly where it was trafficking for the purposes of prostitution, but the ambiguity of "immoral purpose" effectively criminalized interracial marriage and banned single women from crossing state borders for morally wrong acts. As more women were being trafficked from foreign countries, the US began passing immigration acts to curtail aliens from entering the country. Several acts such as the Emergency Quota Act of 1921 and Immigration Act of 1924 were passed to prevent emigrants from Europe and Asia from entering the United States. Following the banning of immigrants during the 1920s, human trafficking was not considered a major issue until the 1990s.

The 1921 Convention set new goals for international efforts to stem human trafficking, primarily by giving the anti-trafficking movement further official recognition, as well as a bureaucratic apparatus to research and fight the problem. The Advisory Committee on the Traffic of Women and Children was a permanent advisory committee of the League. Its members were nine countries, and several non-governmental organizations. An important development was the implementation of a system of annual reports of member countries. Member countries formed their own centralized offices to track and report on trafficking of women and children. The advisory committee also worked to expand its research and intervention program beyond the United States and Europe. In 1929, a need to expand into the Near East (Asia Minor), the Middle East and Asia was acknowledged. An international conference of central authorities in Asia was planned for 1937, but no further action was taken during the late 1930s.

Sex trafficking 

Act 18 U.S.C. § 1591, or the Commercial Sex Act, the US makes it illegal to recruit, entice, obtain, provide, move or harbor a person or to benefit from such activities knowing that the person will be caused to engage in commercial sex acts where the person is under 18 or where force, fraud or coercion exists.

Under the Bush Administration, fighting sex slavery worldwide and domestically became a priority with an average of $100 million spent per year, which substantially outnumbers the amount spent by other countries. Before President Bush took office, Congress passed the Victims of Trafficking and Violence Protection Act of 2000 (TVPA). The TVPA strengthened services to victims of violence, law enforcements ability to reduce violence against women and children, and education against human trafficking. Also specified in the TVPA was a mandate to collect funds for the treatment of sex trafficking victims that provided them with shelter, food, education, and financial grants. Internationally, the TVPA set standards that governments of other countries must follow in order to receive aid from the U.S. to fight human trafficking. Once George W. Bush took office in 2001, restricting sex trafficking became one of his primary humanitarian efforts. The Attorney General under President Bush, John Ashcroft, strongly enforced the TVPA.  The Act was subsequently renewed in 2004, 2006, and 2008. It established two stipulations an applicant has to meet in order to receive the benefits of a T-Visa. First, a trafficked victim must prove/admit to being trafficked and second must submit to prosecution of his or her trafficker.  In 2011, Congress failed to re-authorize the Act.  The State Department publishes an annual Trafficking in Persons Report, which examines the progress that the U.S. and other countries have made in destroying human trafficking businesses, arresting the kingpins, and rescuing the victims.

See also
 Enslaved women's resistance in the United States and Caribbean
 Marriage of enslaved people (United States)
 Children of the plantation

References

Human trafficking in the United States
Organized crime activity
United States
Forced prostitution in the United States